Wildlife Park is a construction and management simulation game released in 2003. Like Zoo Tycoon and Zoo Empire, the game involves players in building a wildlife park or zoo. The game spawned two sequels.

Reception 

The game received "mixed or average" reviews, according to video game review score aggregator Metacritic.

References

External links
GameSpot profile
IGN profile

2003 video games
Business simulation games
Video games developed in Germany
Windows games
JoWooD Entertainment games
Windows-only games
Video games set in zoos
Deep Silver games
Single-player video games
Encore Software games